Austria competed at the 2020 Winter Youth Olympics in Lausanne, Switzerland from 9 to 22 January 2020.

Medalists

Alpine skiing

Boys

Girls

Mixed

Biathlon

Boys

Girls

Mixed

Cross-country skiing 

Boys

Girls

Freestyle skiing 

Lisa Titscher also qualify to the Games, but she crashed during before the Olympics training session in Reiteralm, and didn't travel with team.

Ski cross

Slopestyle & Big Air

Ice hockey

3x3

Girls
Emma Hofbauer
Marja Linzbichler
Magdalena Luggin
Lisa Schröfl

Luge

Boys

Girls

The first nominated Selina Egle broke a foot during the training. Re-nominated is Madlen Loß for the single event, an Austrian double will not start.

Nordic combined 

Individual

Nordic mixed team

Short track speed skating

One Austrian skater achieved quota place for Austria based on the results of the 2019 World Junior Short Track Speed Skating Championships.

Boys

Skeleton

Ski jumping

Boys

Girls

Team

Ski mountaineering

Boys

Girls

Sprint

Mixed

Snowboarding

Snowboard cross

Halfpipe, Slopestyle, & Big Air

Snowboard and ski cross relay

Speed skating

One Austrian skater achieved quota place for Austria based on the results of the 2019 World Junior Speed Skating Championships.

Boys

Mass Start

Mixed

See also
Austria at the Youth Olympics
Austria at the 2020 Summer Olympics

References

2020 in Austrian sport
Nations at the 2020 Winter Youth Olympics
Austria at the Youth Olympics